Deh-e Morghu (also Romanized as Deh-e Morghū; also known as Marghu, Marghū Kharābeh, and Mārkū) is a village in Kavirat Rural District, Chatrud District, Kerman County, Kerman Province, Iran. At the 2006 census, its population was 34, in 7 families.

References 

Populated places in Kerman County